Bernard Louis Marie Charrier (born 4 August 1938 in Nantes) is a French Roman Catholic bishop.

Ordained to the priesthood on 29 June 1964, Charrier was named bishop of the Roman Catholic Diocese of Tulle, France on 22 January 2001 and retired on 12 December 2013.

References 

1938 births
Living people
Clergy from Nantes
Bishops of Tulle